Kadambery is a locality as well as a Municipal Ward of Anthoor Municipality in Kannur district of Kerala in India

Location and Local Governance 
Kadambery is a village in North Malabar. It is situated in Anthoor Municipality of Kannur district. Kadambery comes under the Morazha village.

kadambery is surrounded by Bakkalam, Dharmashala and Peelery

Politics 
Kadambery is the 9th Ward of Anthoor Municipality.

 Councillor - M KANNAN
 M.L.A. - James Mathew
 M.P. - P. K. Sreemathy

Education 
Kadambery A.L.P. School is in muthirakkal area of the village, and Kadambery Govt.U.P. School is situated in Ayyankol.

Government College of Engineering, Kannur and National Institute of Fashion Technology, Kannur are in Dharmashala, a neighbouring place of Kadambery

C.R.C Public Library And Reading Room 
founded in the 1950s the C.R.C is an active participant in the social activities of Kadambery village. which organises many Groups and activities like Balavedi, Yuvajana Kalasamithi etc. and arts and sports activities and training.

History

Morazha Incident 
Kadambery is a part of Morazha village where the Morazha incident of 1940 occurred. C.K Panikkar, P. Govindan Nair, P. Balakrishnan Nair where the main participants of morazha incident from Kadambery

etymology 
The name Kadambery is related to the myths of Kadambery Chuzhali Bhagavathi Temple. a maiden from beyond the sea reached the sea shores of Cherukunnu. one day she reached the forest area of this village before nightfall, to spend the night she climbed a kadambu tree (ironwood), the place where the maiden climbed the kadambu tree became known as Kadamberi - which is a combination of 2 words. "kadambu" a Malayalam name of a tree and "eari" means to climb. later Kadamberi became Kadambery

References 

Villages in Kannur district